The 1996 Governor General's Awards for Literary Merit were presented on November 14, 1996.

English

French

Governor General's Awards
Governor
Governor